Lectionary 272, designated by siglum ℓ 272 (in the Gregory-Aland numbering) is a Greek manuscript of the New Testament, on paper. Palaeographically it has been assigned to the 16th century.
Scrivener labelled it as 178e,
Gregory by 272e. Formerly it was known as Nanianus 223. The manuscript has complex contents.

Description 

The codex contains lessons from the Gospel of John, Matthew, and Luke (Evangelistarium).
It contains text of the Pericope Adulterae.

The text is written in Greek minuscule letters, on 276 paper leaves, in one column per page, 23 lines per page. It contains music notes.

The manuscript contains weekday Gospel lessons.

History 

Scrivener and Gregory dated the manuscript to the 16th century. It is presently assigned by the INTF to the 16th century.

Formerly it belonged to Papas Zankarol from Corfu.

The manuscript was added to the list of New Testament manuscripts by Scrivener (number 178e) and Gregory (number 272e). Gregory saw the manuscript in 1886.

The manuscript is not cited in the critical editions of the Greek New Testament (UBS3).

Currently the codex is housed at the Biblioteca Marciana (Gr. I.52 (1200)) in Venice.

See also 

 List of New Testament lectionaries
 Biblical manuscript
 Textual criticism
 Lectionary 271

Notes and references

Bibliography 

 

Greek New Testament lectionaries
16th-century biblical manuscripts